The KML Best Defender Award is an award for the top-tier professional basketball league in Estonia, the Korvpalli Meistriliiga.

Winners

See also
 Korvpalli Meistriliiga
 KML Most Valuable Player Award
 KML Finals Most Valuable Player Award
 KML Best Young Player Award
 KML Coach of the Year
 All-KML Team

References

External links
Official website

Korvpalli Meistriliiga